Amir Darvish is an American actor who is best known for his portrayal of rock icon Freddie Mercury in the Off Broadway 1997 play Mercury: The Afterlife and Times of a Rock God. In 2003, after two successful runs of the play (in 1997 and 1998), the show's producers mounted the play again in New York City, with Darvish playing the role of Mercury and play author Charles Messina directing. The show moved to the Triad Theater (also in New York City) in January, 2004. BackStage said of Darvish's performance: "Amir Darvish brings an almost Shakespearean theatricality, sardonic humor, and passionate intensity to his interpretation ... Darvish...keeps you riveted throughout ... Darvish sustains the illusion right till the end in bravura fashion." Darvish is of Persian descent.

Filmography 
 The American Astronaut (2001)
 Open Cam (2005)
 The Pink Panther (2006)
 Confessions (2006)
 The Atlas Mountains (2009)
 October Haze (2009)
 Trooper (2010)
 Month to Month (2011)

Other appearances 

 Darvish has appeared on several television shows, including: Spin City, NYPD Blue, Law & Order, and most recently TV You Control: Bar Karma.
 In 2008, Darvish appeared as Hossain in the video game Grand Theft Auto IV.
 In 2010, Darvish won the New York Innovative Theatre Award for Outstanding Actor in a Featured Role for his performance in the play Psych.

References

External links 
 Official site
 Amir Darvish on Internet Movie Database (IMDb)

Year of birth missing (living people)
Living people
American male television actors
American male stage actors
Place of birth missing (living people)